The Asthma and Bronchitis Association of India (ABAI) was founded in 1984 at the pulmonary function laboratory of St. George's Hospital in Mumbai. It is one of the earliest nonprofit, non-governmental organizations solely dedicated to improving education and awareness for all asthma and allergy patients in India. It organizes several activities famed at improving asthma patients' well-being, including:

 An annual trek
 Annual sports meet
 Health check-up scheme for members
 Provision of emergency inhalers at a discount rate
 Nebulizers for rent at minimal cost
 Newsletter (Asthma Times) offering information on asthma and asthma care
 Anti-tobacco campaigns
 Asthma camps and community programmes

The association also works to increase awareness about asthma in India, particularly in Mumbai. It has published articles in newspapers including The Times of India, Mumbai Mirror, DNA, Hindustan Times, and many others.

The association has over 10,000 registered members and over 500 active volunteers. It has three reputed chest physicians and asthma specialists on its core panel. Though it still operates from its initial location at St. George's Hospital, ABAI has another satellite office at the Asthma Allergy Clinic in central Mumbai.

References

Asthma organizations
Medical and health organisations based in India